Bewitched Love is a 1967 Spanish drama film directed by Francisco Rovira Beleta and based on the eponymous ballet by Manuel de Falla. It was nominated for the Academy Award for Best Foreign Language Film. It was also entered into the 5th Moscow International Film Festival.

Cast
 Antonio Gades as Antonio
 La Polaca as Candelas
 Rafael de Córdoba as Diego Sánchez
 Morucha as Lucía
 Nuria Torray as Soledad
 José Manuel Martín as Lorenzo
 Fernando Sánchez Polack as Padre de Candelas

See also
 List of submissions to the 40th Academy Awards for Best Foreign Language Film
 List of Spanish submissions for the Academy Award for Best Foreign Language Film
 El Amor brujo (1986)

References

External links
 

1967 films
1967 drama films
1960s Spanish-language films
Films directed by Francisco Rovira Beleta
Flamenco films
1960s dance films
Spanish drama films
1960s Spanish films